Vermont Route 67 (VT 67) is a  east–west state highway in Bennington County, Vermont, United States. It runs from a continuation of New York State Route 67 at the New York state line in Shaftsbury to VT 7A farther east in the town. VT 67 also passes through the village of North Bennington.

Route description

VT 67 starts at the New York state line as an eastward continuation of New York State Route 67. It curves twice, intersecting with White Creek Road, a continuation of Washington County, New York, County Route 68.

In North Bennington, VT 67 meets the northern terminus of VT 67A. As it does so, it curves straight north, with a secondary street (Houghton Street) leading to Lake Paran. After the intersection with Hawks Avenue, it takes a northeasterly path, ending at VT 7A in Shaftsbury.

History
VT 67 was assigned by 1935, when it was added to the Vermont state highway system as part of the 1935 state highway system expansion.

Major intersections

Suffixed and special routes

Vermont Route 67A

Vermont Route 67A is a north–south state highway in Bennington County.

Major intersections

Vermont Route 67A Connector

Vermont Route 67A Connector was a connector route of VT 67A in Bennington. It was a short limited-access highway linking VT 67A to U.S. Route 7. VT 67A Connector was assigned in 1974 and removed in 2004 concurrent to the assignment of VT 279.

References

External links

067
Transportation in Bennington County, Vermont